North West Arm was a community near Valleyfield in Bonavista Bay, Newfoundland. It was located on the southwest side of a long indraft of the same name and was settled about 1880, but was abandoned by 1960. North West Arm first appeared in the 1891 census with a population of 77. In the 1935 census, this had increased to 143 people, and by 1945 it had climbed further to 153, before reaching a peak of 160 in 1951. The area once occupied by North West Arm is now within the boundaries of the town of New-Wes-Valley.

External links 
Census Of Newfoundland 1891 District of Bonavista - North West Arm
McAlpine's 1894-97 Directory Bonavista District - North West Arm
McAlpine's 1898 Directory Bonavista District - North West Arm
McAlpine's 1904 Directory Bonavista Bay District - North West Arm
Newfoundland's 1935 Census District of Bonavista - Community of North West Arm
Newfoundland's 1945 Census District of Bonavista Bay North - Community of North West Arm
North West Arm, Newfoundland
North West Arm
Encyclopedia of Newfoundland and Labrador - North West Arm

See also
List of communities in Newfoundland and Labrador
Bonavista Bay

Ghost towns in Newfoundland and Labrador